Jacob Rush (1746/47–1820) was an American jurist.

Life 
Jacob Rush, brother of Benjamin Rush, was born near Philadelphia, perhaps in Byberry Township, Pennsylvania, about December, 1746, or January, 1747. He was graduated at Princeton in 1765, settled in the practice of law in Philadelphia, was a judge of the High Court of Errors and Appeals of Pennsylvania in 1784–1806, president of the Court of Common Pleas of Philadelphia in 1806–20, and at an earlier date was a justice of the Supreme Court of Pennsylvania.

In the controversy between Joseph Reed and John Dickinson as to the character of Benedict Arnold, Judge Rush espoused the latter's cause, defending Arnold against the charges of Reed in 1779. Princeton gave him the degree LL.D. in 1804. He died in Philadelphia on January 5, 1820.

Works 
His publications include:
 Resolve in Committee Chamber 6 Dec., 1774 (Philadelphia, 1774);
 Charges on Moral and Religious Subjects (1803);
 Character of Christ (1806);
 Christian Baptism (1819).

His daughter, Rebecca, published Kelroy, a novel (Philadelphia, 1812).

References

Sources

External links 
 Ockerbloom, John Mark, ed. "Rush, Jacob, 1747-1820". The Online Books Page. Retrieved 29 August 2022.

1740s births
1820 deaths
Justices of the Supreme Court of Pennsylvania
19th-century American non-fiction writers
Year of birth uncertain